Olifantshoek is a village in Makhado Local Municipality in the Limpopo province of South Africa. Surrounded by Tiyani, Mamaila and Rotterdam villages, with the Ritavi River separating Olifantshoek, Dengeza, Noblehoek and others.

It was formerly under Mopani District Municipality but later demarcated to Vhembe District Municipality early in 2000. It is one of the poorest villages in the Makhado Municipality.

References

Populated places in the Makhado Local Municipality